Dr. Christiana Ayoka Mary Thorpe (born 16 August 1949 in Freetown, Sierra Leone) is a former two-term Chief Electoral Commissioner and Chairperson of the National Electoral Commission, an independent agency created by the Sierra Leone government to organise and supervise national, regional and local elections. She is the first woman Chief Electoral Commissioner in the country's history. She was also a Deputy Minister of Education in the 1990s. In March 2016, she was appointed a Deputy Minister of Education, Science and Technology, though one source states that Parliamentary approval was still pending.

Early life
Thorpe grew up in one of Freetown's poorest communities. In 1952, she and a younger sister went to live with their grandmother Christiana (for whom she was named) in the poor neighbourhood of Kroo Bay because their parents were overburdened with a large family (eventually eight children). The elder Christiana was a washerwoman and herbalist who was to have a great influence on her. She and her sister were the only girls in the neighbourhood who went to school. She used to teach what she had learned to other girls, discovering that she loved teaching.

After she completed secondary school, she left for Ireland, where she studied in a convent and became a nun. She attended University College Dublin and obtained a degree, followed by a master's and a Ph.D. in the British West Indies.

Career in education and government
She returned to Sierra Leone and became the principal of St. Joseph's Secondary School for girls in Makeni, a village north of the capital city of Freetown. After 20 years as a nun, she found that following convent rules and regulations conflicted with her teaching, and she made the painful decision to leave the convent.

When Captain Valentine Strasser seized power in 1992, Dr. Thorpe was the only woman in his cabinet of 19 ministers, serving as Deputy Minister of Education. In 1995, she formed and chaired the Sierra Leone branch of the Forum for African Women Educationalists.

In 2005, Ahmad Tejan Kabbah, President of Sierra Leone, asked her to head the National Electoral Commission. She served as Chief Electoral Commissioner for two consecutive five-year terms, although when then-President Ernest Bai Koroma nominated her for her second term, the opposition Sierra Leone People's Party raised concerns about the neutrality of the commission and walked out of Parliament in protest. She introduce the Biometric Voter Registration system, which combats voter registration fraud.

After the end of her second term, in 2016, she was appointed one of two Deputy Ministers of Education, Science and Technology in a cabinet reshuffle, though one source states that Parliamentary approval was still pending as of April.

Honours
Thorpe has received one of the 2006 Voices of Courage Awards from the Women's Commission for Refugee Women and Children.

On November 3, 2014, the International Foundation for Electoral Systems presented to her the Joe C. Baxter Award.

References

Living people
1949 births
Sierra Leone Creole people
Sierra Leonean educators
Former Roman Catholic religious sisters and nuns
Alumni of University College Dublin
20th-century Roman Catholic nuns